Berezivka Raion is a raion (district) in Odesa Oblast of Ukraine. Its administrative center is the city of Berezivka. Population: 

On 18 July 2020, as part of the administrative reform of Ukraine, the number of raions of Odesa Oblast was reduced to seven, and the area of Berezivka Raion was significantly expanded.  The January 2020 estimate of the raion population was

Administrative division

Current
After the reform in July 2020, the raion consisted of 16 hromadas:

 Andrievo-Ivanivka Hromada
 Berezivka urban hromada with the administration in the city of Berezivka, retained from Berezivka Raion;
 Chohodarivka Hromada
 Ivanivka Hromada
 Konopliane Hromada
 Kurisove Hromada
 Mykolaivka Hromada
 Novokalcheve rural hromada with the administration in the selo of Novokalcheve, retained from Berezivka Raion;
 Petrovirivka Hromada
 Raukhivka settlement hromada with the administration in the urban-type settlement of Raukhivka, retained from Berezivka Raion;
 Rozkvit rural hromada with the administration in the selo of Rozkvit, retained from Berezivka Raion;
 Stari Mayaky Hromada
 Shyriaieve settlement hromada
 Striukove Hromada
 Velykyi Buyalyk Hromada
 Znamianka Hromada

Before 2020

Before the 2020 reform, the raion consisted of four hromadas, 
 Berezivka urban hromada, with the administration in Berezivka;
 Novokalcheve rural hromada with the administration in Novokalcheve;
 Raukhivka settlement hromada with the administration in Raukhivka;
 Rozkvit rural hromada with the administration in Rozkvit.

References

 
Raions of Odesa Oblast
1923 establishments in Ukraine